Sebeta City (Oromo: Magaalaa sabbataa; Amharic: ሰበታ ከተማ, Sebeta Ketema) is a professional football club based in Sebeta, Ethiopia. They play in the Ethiopian Higher League, the second division of Ethiopian football.

History
Sebeta City F.C. was founded in 2005.

In the 2010–2011 season of Ethiopian Premier League, the club was relegated to the Ethiopian second division after finishing in fourteenth place.

The club was promoted to the Ethiopian Premier League after winning their group in the 2018-19 Ethiopian Higher League season.

Stadium 
Their home stadium is Sebeta Stadium, which has a capacity of 5,000. As part of a sponsorship deal, the club announced that a standard football pitch would be constructed at Sebeta Stadium. The renovation work at the stadium was finished in April 2020.

Finances 
In December 2019 the club signed a four year sponsorship deal, worth 18 million Birr a year, with Meta Abo Brewery. The club had a contractual dispute with their former head coach Webetu Abate and the EFF after he left the club to coach the Ethiopian national team.

Players

First-team squad
As of 8 January 2021

Club Officials 
CEO:  Alemayehu Mendaye

Chairman:  Obsa Legese

Coaching staff 
Manager/Head coach: Abraham Mebratu

Former players 

  Savio Kabugo (2019–20)

See also
Ethiopian Cup
List of football clubs in Ethiopia

References

External links

 Sebeta City at national-football-teams.com

Football clubs in Ethiopia
Sport in Oromia Region